Dragon is a stop-motion children's television program which is based on the books by best-selling children's author Dav Pilkey. 78 episodes were produced and broadcast on Treehouse TV.

Voice cast
 Frank Meschkuleit as narrator and character voices

Characters 

 Dragon – The title character of the show is a friendly-naive dragon (a wingless dragon --resembling a dinosaur). Dragon giggles his way through life. No matter what happens, this jolly hero's glass is always half-full. Slightly awkward, with a giant toothy grin, Dragon is curious about everything and will follow his nose wherever it may lead him. Happy and helpful, he is always ready to lend a hand. Even when things get messy, Dragon plays it cool. If you take life one step a time, there's nothing to be afraid of. Nothing at all. He's very creative and has many new things that come to mind he would plan for himself and all his friends that love him. Dragon is blue, has 2 white horns on his head, pointy triangle scales from his back to his tail, a big round stomach, big nose, and tiny little black eyes.
 Cat – Dragon's cat. Unlike Dragon's other anthropomorphic friends, Cat is really just a typical cat. Dropping in from time to time, Cat will happily accompany Dragon for a while. But she'll only stick around as long as she's interested. And then, she's off in search of her own adventures. Satisfied and self-absorbed, Cat is highly fussy about her meals! She's not too concerned about the world around her and she loves to stretch out for long naps. Cat is grey with black stripes on her back.
 Beaver – A busy and curious beaver. Beaver likes to keep busy. Most of the time, he's doing chores and rebuilding his home while he mutters and grumbles to himself. He repeats "Yes" and "No" a lot possibly because of his personality. For Beaver, life is no picnic. Beaver is always looking for a better and faster way of getting things done. Unfortunately, Beaver's shoddy workmanship usually has him working overtime. Curious and cantankerous, Beaver is constantly pondering how and why things are done the way they are. Beaver is brown and wears green overalls. He has an oval-shaped head, big teeth sticking from out of his mouth, 2 tiny ears and black eyes.
 Mail Mouse – A mouse who is reliable and is bold. Mail Mouse loves her job and she's shown to be good at it. Sometimes, she hand delivers the mail, and at other times, she just leaves it at the mailbox. Either way, she's quick, reliable and a lot of fun. Opinionated and always willing to lend a helping hand, Mail Mouse is generous with her advice. She's bold without being pushy and that's just the way the others like her. Mail Mouse is yellowish wearing a blue mail shirt and mail hat, her mouth is barely seen, she has her teeth sticking out from her mouth like Beaver, a long tail, and tiny black eyes.
 Ostrich – An ostrich who runs a general store. Ostrich is a strange and wonderful bird. Ostrich is always busy with something. She has a head for business and manages her own general store. She can also be seen tidying the streets and clocking time as the village's physician. Ostrich tries very hard to be a superhero, and she is determined to rescue people, whether or not they need to be rescued. She has even developed her very own superhero yodel and dance. Ostrich has a long and light purple neck, white wings, a yellow beak, long pink and black polka dotted legs, a grey back and stomach, and tiny little black eyes.
 Alligator – A kooky and creative alligator. Alligator never worries about finding a solution. His only solution is never to worry. For Alligator, life is a journey and he's enjoying the ride! Kooky, creative and loved by all, Alligator even has his own lingo: "Hidy-ho, little blue dude!" which he says and calls Dragon. And there's one thing that Alligator loves more than anything else. He just cannot stop dancing, playing the bongos, and making noise. Alligator is green with big sharp teeth in his mouth, he has medium circled stomach with crossed lines, he's the only one with bigger black eyes.

Episodes

Season 1 (2004) 

 This season premiered in Canada on January 5, 2004 and in the United States on Qubo in September 2006.

Season 2 (2005) 

 The credits in this season are stacked.
 This season premiered in Canada on July 8, 2005.

Season 3 (2007) 

 This season premiered in Canada on July 6, 2007.
 All episodes in this season are written by Steven Westren.

Broadcast 
Dragon premiered in Canada on Treehouse TV on January 5, 2004. The show aired the assorted episodes until December 31, 2007 and have aired the unassorted episodes from January 1, 2008 to June 30, 2012. On September 9, 2006, the show aired on Qubo in the United States with the TV-Y rating and the E/I ident, and it aired on this channel as part of the channel launch and aired until September 12, 2009. It returned to Qubo and aired again from October 2, 2010 to February 12, 2012 and then returned for the third and final time on October 1, 2012 before being taken off the air once again on September 25, 2015. It has also been aired on ZDF in Germany, Rai in Italy, RTV in Slovenia, EBS in Korea (as 내 친구 드래곤 or My Friend Dragon), Disney Channel in Germany, KRO in the Netherlands, ABC Television in Australia, Cartoon Network in Latin America and SVT in Barnkanalen. The show is currently airing on Kids Street in the US and Knowledge Network in Canada.

References

External links
 
 Dragon on the Treehouse TV website (2012).
 Dragon website archived by the Wayback Machine (Internet Archive)

2004 American television series debuts
2007 American television series endings
2000s American animated television series
2004 Canadian television series debuts
2007 Canadian television series endings
2000s Canadian animated television series
Television series based on books by Dav Pilkey
American television shows based on children's books
American children's animated adventure television series
American children's animated comedy television series
American children's animated fantasy television series
American preschool education television series
Canadian television shows based on children's books
Canadian children's animated adventure television series
Canadian children's animated comedy television series
Canadian children's animated fantasy television series
Canadian preschool education television series
Animated television series about dragons
American stop-motion animated television series
Canadian stop-motion animated television series
Treehouse TV original programming
Television series by Corus Entertainment
English-language television shows
Animated preschool education television series
2000s preschool education television series
Qubo